Schlüsselberg was a Franconian aristocratic family which was a member of the high nobility. Until it died out in 1347, the family was able to establish itself firmly in the region of Franconian Switzerland and turned out to be unwelcome competition for the bishops of Bamberg. The Schlüsselbergs founded inter alia the town of a number of Schlüsselfeld in 1336 as well as Schlüsselau Abbey.

Members of the family 
 Eberhard I of Schlüsselberg (died 1243), married to a Swabian countess of Eberstein, founded the House of Schlüsselberg in 1216
 Eberhard II of Schlüsselberg (died 1283), founder of Schlüsselau Abbey (1280), married to Elisabeth of Hohenzollern-Nuremberg
 Conrad I of Schlüsselberg (died 1308), son of Eberhard II and co-founder of Schlüsselau Abbey
 Godfrey of Schlüsselberg (died 1308), son of Eberhard II and co-founder of Schlüsselau Abbey, first marriage to Mechthild of Wertheim and second to Margreth of Katzenelnbogen
 Gisela of Schlüsselberg (died 1308), daughter of Eberhard II and first abbess of Schlüsselau Abbey
 Ulrich of Schlüsselberg (died 1322), son of Eberhard II, selected (from a list of two), but not installed as Bishop of Bamberg (1318–1321), Bishop of Brixen in 1322
 Conrad II of Schlüsselberg (died 1347), son of Conrad I, first marriage to Lukardis of Hohenzollern-Nuremberg and second marriage to Agnes of Württemberg, Reichssturmfähnrich from 1322 to 1336
 Elisabeth of Schlüsselberg (died nach 1350), daughter of Godfrey (first marriage), married to Count Conrad of Vaihingen
 Richza of Schlüsselberg (died 1348), daughter of Conrad II (first marriage), married to Count Günther XVIII of Schwarzburg-Wachsenburg
 Beatrice of Schlüsselberg (1364), daughter of Conrad II (first marriage), married to Count Ulrich VI of Helfenstein, son of Conrad second wife, Agnes of Württemberg-Helfenstein (first marriage)
 Anna of Schlüsselberg (died 1379), daughter of Conrad II and Lukardis, nun and, from 1339, Abbess of Schlüsselau Abbey
 Hildegard of Schlüsselberg, daughter of Conrad II (second marriage), married to Eitel Frederick of Zollern
 Sophia of Schlüsselberg (died after 1360), probably the sister of Conrad II, married to Frederick III, the old knight, of Hohenzollern-Schalksburg, who complained in 1360 against the Bishop of Bamberg over hereditary titles.

Related noble families 
 Eberstein in Swabia
 Gründlach in Franconia
 Helfenstein and Württemberg in Swabia
 Hohenzollern-Hechingen in Swabia, Hohenzollern-Nürnberg in Franconia
and Hohenzollern-Schalksburg in Swabia
 Leuchtenberg in Franconia
 Montfort in Swabia
 Wachsenburg side line of the counts of Schwarzburg in Thuringia and Franconia
 Vaihingen in Swabia
 Wertheim in Franconia

Literature 
 Rudolf Endres: Konrad von Schlüsselberg. In: Gerhard Pfeiffer (ed.): Fränkische Lebensbilder. Vol. 4. Kommissionsverlag Ferdinand Schöningh, Würzburg, 1971, (Veröffentlichungen der Gesellschaft für Fränkische Geschichte, Reihe VII A. Band 4), pp. 27–48.
 
 Paul Oesterreicher: Der Reichsherr Gottfried von Schlüsselberg. Ein geschichtlicher Abriß. Mit den Geschlechtstafeln der Reichsherren von Schlüsselberg und von Weischenfeld. Verlag des Verfassers. Bamberg 1821. Google
 Paul Österreicher: Neue Beiträge zur Geschichte der ehemaligen Reichsherrschaft Schlüsselberg. Bamberg, 1823.
 Paul Oesterreicher: Geschichte und Beschreibung des Radenzgaues und des ursprünglichen Bisthums Bamberg. Bamberg, 1832. Google
 Hermann Römer: Markgröningen im Rahmen der Landesgeschichte I., Urgeschichte und Mittelalter. Markgröningen, 1933, pp. 111–121.
  Gustav Voit, Brigitte Kaulich, Walter Rüfer: Vom Land im Gebirg zur Fränkischen Schweiz. Eine Landschaft wird entdeckt. Palm und Enke, Erlangen, 1992,  (Die Fränkische Schweiz - Landschaft und Kultur 8).
  Gustav Voit: Die Schlüsselberger. Geschichte eines fränkischen Adelsgeschlechtes. Nuremberg, 1988.
 Voigt, Gustav; der Adel am Obermain. Die Plassenburg – Schriften für Heimatforschung und Kulturpflege in Ostfranken, Vol. 28, Kulmbach, 1969.

References

External links

Franconian nobility
German noble families